One Hundred Nails is a 2007 Italian drama film directed by Ermanno Olmi, starring Raz Degan. It tells the story of a young professor who leaves his position at the University of Bologna to live in an old farmhouse by the river Po, where he gets involved with the local population. The film was shown as a Special Screening at the 2007 Cannes Film Festival. It received the Critics Award at the 2007 David di Donatello Awards and was nominated in eight more categories, including Best Film.

Reception
Variety's Jay Weissberg called the film "disappointing" and wrote: "In many ways, One Hundred Nails harks back to Olmi's earliest films, with a touch of Pasolini, evident not only in the locations but also the largely nonpro cast. Fabio Olmi's lensing repeatedly returns to the river's calm, presenting a timeless land of purer values than those of the city, though lacking the richness of his last two pics with father Ermanno." Geoff Andrew of Time Out London described it as "a bizarre, elegant gem", and wrote: "Not unlike a latterday, more effective Miracle in Milan, this profoundly Catholic, profoundly personal fable veers, like many Olmi films, between the seemingly inept and the spellbindingly innocent, magical in its tenderness, its striking visuals and its unpredictability. Don't miss – but give it time."

References

External links
 
 

2007 drama films
2007 films
Films directed by Ermanno Olmi
Italian drama films
2000s Italian-language films
2000s Italian films